Jonathan or John Crane may refer to:
 Jonathan Crane (politician) (1750–1820), politician in Nova Scotia
 Jonathan Townley Crane (1819–1880), American clergyman, author and abolitionist
 John Crane (American politician), politician in Indiana
 John Crane (Australian politician) (1868–1948), member of the New South Wales Legislative Assembly
 John Crane (Canadian politician) (born 1935), Canadian politician
 John Crane (comptroller), English soldier based at Berwick-upon-Tweed
 John Crane (government official), U.S. Inspector General who supports whistleblowers
 John Crane (soldier) (1744–1805), participant in the Boston Tea Party and a soldier during the American Revolutionary War
 John Crane (writer) (born 1962), writer and television producer
Companies
 John Crane Group, manufacturer of mechanical seals.
Fictional characters
 Scarecrow (DC Comics), also known as Dr. Jonathan Crane, DC Comics supervillain and enemy of Batman

See also
 Jack Crain (1920–1994), American football player